Jamie Ben Houston (born 5 August 1982) is a retired German international rugby union player, having played for the SC 1880 Frankfurt in the Rugby-Bundesliga and the German national rugby union team. He most recently was coach of RG Heidelberg in the Rugby-Bundesliga.

He made his debut for Germany in a friendly versus Hong Kong on 12 December 2009. Houston, born in England, qualifies to play for Germany after having spent three years playing in the country for the SC 1880 Frankfurt.

Houston played in the 2009 German championship final for SC 1880 Frankfurt, which the club won.

After a neck injury, Houston had to retire from the sport in 2010, pursuing his career as a fitness instructor instead, but remaining in Germany.

After a season as coach of the reserve team of SC 1880 Frankfurt, he took over as head coach of RG Heidelberg for Rudolf Finsterer for the 2011–12 season. At the end of his first season with RGH he was replaced with the club's youth coach Bernd Schöpfel.

Honours

Club
 German rugby union championship
 Champions: 2008, 2009
 Runners up: 2007, 2010
 German rugby union cup
 Winners: 2009

Stats
Jamie Houston's personal statistics in club and international rugby:

Club

 As of 15 December 2010

National team

European Nations Cup

Friendlies & other competitions

 As of 15 December 2010

References

External links
 Jamie Houston at scrum.com
   Jamie Houston at totalrugby.de

1982 births
Living people
English rugby union players
German rugby union players
Germany international rugby union players
Naturalized citizens of Germany
SC 1880 Frankfurt players
Rugby union hookers
German rugby union coaches
Expatriate rugby union players in Australia
English expatriate sportspeople in Australia
English expatriate rugby union players